Megumi Satō may refer to:

, Japanese actress and television personality
, Japanese high jumper